The 2019–20 Alpe Adria Cup was the fifth edition of this tournament. The final games of Alpe Adria Cup were postponed to September 2020 due to the COVID-19 pandemic. JIP Pardubice won its first title.

Format 
Sixteen teams from seven countries joined the competition and were divided into four groups of four teams, where the top two teams from each group will qualify for the quarterfinals.

Regular season

Group A

Group B

Group C

Group D

Playoffs

References

External links
Official website
Alpe Adria Cup at Eurobasket.com

2019–20
2019–20 in European basketball leagues
2019–20 in Croatian basketball
2019–20 in Slovenian basketball
2019–20 in Slovak basketball
2019–20 in Austrian basketball
2019–20 in Czech basketball
Alpe